Antony Lecointe (born 5 October 1980, in Boulogne-sur-Mer) is a French football defender. He currently plays for Championnat National side USL Dunkerque.

Career
Lecointe began his career at his town club US Boulogne.

External links 

 
 

Living people
1980 births
French footballers
Ligue 1 players
Ligue 2 players
Championnat National players
US Boulogne players
USL Dunkerque players
Association football defenders